The ARMAT missile is a development of the Anglo-French Martel anti-radar missile. The Martel was further developed by British Aerospace to give the Sea Eagle anti-ship missile, while Britain adopted ALARM for their new ARM missile. France instead adopted the Exocet as their anti-ship missile in the 1970s, and used the ARMAT as new anti-radar weapon. This missile is unusually slow and huge when compared to western anti-radar missiles, reflecting the original anti-ship task of the ancestor, the AS.37/AJ.168 Martel.

ARMAT is not well known in details. It is a two-stage solid propelled missile, highly subsonic, with a range up to 120 km. The warhead weighs 150 kg with proximity fuse and delayed impact. The ARMAT was operational since 1984. It was used as main, if not exclusive anti-radar weapon by French aviation, employed by SEPECAT Jaguars against Libyans during Operation Epervier. It was also used by Iraqi aviation against Iranian defences.

ARMAT is used on Mirage F.1, Mirage 2000 and some other French aircraft, but not with the new Dassault Rafale. An improved product, the MARS, was proposed in 1988. In early 1990s it seems that the basic ARMAT was upgraded with better electronic systems.

References

Notes
 Friedman, Norman. The Naval Institute Guide to World Naval Weapons Systems 1997–98. Annapolis, Naval Institute Press, 1997. .
 Richardson, Doug. "World Missile Directory". Flight International, 1 October 1988, pp. 33–71.

External links
Ancile
Defense & Security Intelligence & Analysis: IHS Jane's | IHS

Anti-radiation missiles of France
Military equipment introduced in the 1980s
Air-to-surface missiles of the Cold War
Air-to-surface missiles of France